The 1995 Albany Firebirds season was the sixth season for the Albany Firebirds. They finished the 1995 Arena Football League season 7–5 and lost in the semifinals of the AFL playoffs to the Tampa Bay Storm.

Schedule

Regular season

Playoffs
The Firebirds were seeded seventh overall in the AFL playoffs, despite winning their division.

Standings

Awards

References

Indiana Firebirds seasons
1995 Arena Football League season
Albany Firebirds Season, 1995